Vice-admiral Jonkheer Theodorus Frederik van Capellen, GCMWO, KCB (Nijmegen, 6 September 1762 – Brussels, 15 April 1824) was a Dutch naval officer. He was married to Petronella de Lange (1779–1835). Alexine Tinne, female explorer and pioneering photographer, was his granddaughter.

Career
Van Capellen entered service in 1781 in the navy of the Dutch Republic. In the Fourth Anglo-Dutch War he distinguished himself in the Dutch defeat of Action of 30 May 1781 between  his ship Den Briel and HMS Crescent, and earned an early promotion to captain in 1783.

In 1792 and 1793 he commanded a flotilla of gun boats in the defense of the Hollands Diep.

On 31 May 1793 he received command of the ship of the line Delft (a 56-gun fourth rate). As such he freed 75 Dutch slaves in Algiers during the expedition of rear-admiral Pieter Melvill van Carnbee.

After the proclamation of the Batavian Republic in 1795 Van Capellen as an adherent of Stadtholder William V, Prince of Orange resigned his commission. However, after the stadtholder had given permission to former naval officers of the navy of the old Republic to enlist in the navy of the new Republic, he obtained a commission in the Batavian navy. In 1798 he received the command of the new third-rate Washington (74).

As such, he and colleague, Aegidius van Braam, captain of Leyden, were approached by an Orangist agent in the run-up to the Anglo-Russian Expedition to North Holland of 1799 with a request to bring about the defection of the Batavian squadron at the Texel under Rear-Admiral Samuel Story, whose flag captain Van Capellen then was. Though it is not known with certainty whether Van Braam and Van Capellen really made preparations to foment a mutiny, they did play a leading role in what has become known as the Vlieter Incident. In any case, Van Capellen was sent to British vice-admiral Mitchell as a parlimentaire on the fateful 30 August 1799, by admiral Story to request a temporary cease-fire. He also played a leading role in the subsequent council of war aboard the Dutch flagship, during which admiral Story was persuaded to surrender his squadron without a fight to the British. Afterward, Van Capellen became a prisoner of war with the other officers and crews of the Batavian squadron until the Peace of Amiens of 1802.

Meanwhile, the government of the Batavian Republic had convened a court-martial to try the officers deemed responsible for the Vlieter debacle. Van Capellen was tried in absentia and convicted on 16 January 1804 (together with admiral Story and two other officers) of dereliction of duty, cowardice, and disloyalty (though not of treason). He was cashiered from the navy and sentenced to banishment for life, on pain of death by firing squad. He therefore spent the years 1799 till the re-emergence of the Dutch state, after its annexation to the French Empire in 1813, in exile in England.

In 1814 he was appointed a vice-admiral in the new Royal Netherlands Navy by the "Sovereign Prince" of the United Netherlands, William I of the Netherlands (who also had played a leading role in the Vlieter Incident in 1799), and on 21 August 1815 was created a Jonkheer by the then new King of the Netherlands. The new navy sent a squadron to the Barbary Coast in 1816 to suppress the activities of the Barbary pirates. This squadron by itself was not powerful enough to make an impression on the Dey of Algiers. However, when a squadron of the Royal Navy under admiral Edward Pellew, 1st Viscount Exmouth arrived with the same mission, the two squadrons joined forces in the Bombardment of Algiers of 27 August 1816.

Van Capellen received the Knight Grand Cross of the Military Order of William on 20 September 1816. He was made an honorary knight-commander of the Order of the Bath by the British government.

Van Capellen retired from the navy in 1818. He then became the Lord Chamberlain of William II of the Netherlands, who then still was the Crown Prince.

References

Sources
 (2002) The Naval History of Great Britain: During the French Revolutionary and Napoleonic Wars. Vol. 2 1797–1799, Stackpole Books, 
 (1893) "Een datum in het levensbericht van den Vice-Admiraal Jhr. T.F. van Capellen (1763–1824)", in  Maandblad van het Genealogisch-Heraldiek Genootschap "De Nederlandsche Leeuw", XIe Jaargang, no. 10, p. 96
  (1862) Geschiedenis van het Nederlandsche zeewezen, A.C. Kruseman
 (1817) "Dispatches  from Queen Charlotte, Algiers Bay, August 28, 1816, by Lord Exmouth, C.G.B. addressed to John Wilson Croker, esq.", in The Annual Register, Or, A View of the History, Politics, and Literature for the Year 1816, pp. 230–238
  (1998) In woelig vaarwater: marineofficieren in de jaren 1779–1802, De Bataafsche Leeuw,

External links

Van Capellen in PersonenEncyclopedie.info 

19th-century Dutch people
Royal Netherlands Navy admirals
People of the Patriottentijd
Dutch military personnel of the French Revolutionary Wars
People from Nijmegen
1762 births
1824 deaths
Knights Grand Cross of the Military Order of William
Knights Commander of the Order of the Bath
18th-century Dutch military personnel